Lucas Brennan (born June 3, 2000) is an American mixed martial artist and jiujitsu practitioner. He is a five-time finalist in the Brazilian-Jiu-Jitsu world championships and a two-time world champion who is currently signed to Bellator MMA. As of June 28, 2022, he is #10 in the Bellator Featherweight Rankings.

Early life and education 
Brennan was born in Irvine, California, in 2000, his family moved to Aubrey, Texas, later in 2006 where he was raised in North Texas. In 2011, Brennan began training in BJJ in middle school. He is the son of American mixed martial artist Chris Brennan.

Brennan graduated Cum Laude from Frisco High School, class of 2018. He was formerly enrolled at the University of North Texas (UNT) in the College of Visual Arts and Design, before leaving to give full commitment to his already ongoing mixed martial arts (MMA) career. Prompted by his signing at age 19 with Bellator prior to his sophomore year.

Career 
Brennan made his amateur MMA debut on August 12, 2017. Brennan won his debut amateur bout in XKO with a third-round rear-naked choke against Christopher Williams (1-0), two months after turning 17 years old and prior to his senior year in high school. 

After winning his debut amateur MMA appearance, his next fight would not be until May 2018, which he won via a unanimous decision against Diara Culpepper (1-0) in the Legacy Fighting Alliance (LFA).

Brennan signed to LFA as their first-ever contracted amateur athlete at the time, but LFA would soon shift ownership, and Brennan returned to being a free agent.

His final amateur fight was under the Tuff-N-Uff banner on June 07, 2019, winning a unanimous decision over Isaac Villegas (11-1) in Las Vegas, Nevada.

Brennan's professional debut was made in Bellator MMA in the featherweight (145lb) weight class on Bellator 224 in July 2019. Brennan won in the first round with a rear-naked choke against Thomas Lopez (1-4). In November 2019, he fought Jacob Landin (0-2) and acquired another win at Bellator 233 with a first-round rear-naked choke. A scheduled bout with Jamese Taylor was canceled on the day of the event in February 2020 due to complications in Taylor's weight cut and supposed health. Later that same year, in Bellator 244 in August, Brennan would face Will Smith (3-1) and win with a TKO in the second round.

In November 2020, Brennan fought Andrew Salas (6-4) and won via unanimous decision at Bellator 252. Brennan missed weight for this bout, coming in at 148 pounds, two pounds over the featherweight non-title limit. The bout continued at a catchweight and Brennan was fined a portion of his purse which went to Salas.

Fighting once in 2021 due to covid complications, Bellator 260, he fought against Matthew Skibicki (4-3) and won via first-round anaconda choke.

In January 2022, he defeated Benjamin Lugo (5-4) at Bellator 273 with his self-appointed assassin choke in the first round. This was a first in Bellator's history and the first submission of 2022.

Brennan was scheduled to face Nick Talavera on November 18, 2022 at Bellator 288. However, Talavera pulled out due to unknown reason the week of the event and the bout was scrapped. He was briefly linked to Bellator 289 against Dre Miley, but Miley was not cleared by the Illonois commission to compete.

Brennan is scheduled to face Josh San Diego on March 31, 2023 at Bellator 293.

Mixed martial arts record

|-
|Win
|align=center|7–0
|Johnny Soto
|Submission (neck crank)
|Bellator 282
|
|align=center|1
|align=center|3:34
|Uncasville, Connecticut, United States
|
|-
|Win
|align=center|6–0
|Ben Lugo
|Submission (assassin choke)
|Bellator 273
|
|align=center|1
|align=center|2:27
|Phoenix, Arizona, United States
|
|-
|Win
|align=center|5–0
|Matthew Skibicki
|Submission (anaconda choke)
|Bellator 260
|
|align=center|1
|align=center|1:54
|Uncasville, Connecticut, United States
|
|-
|Win
|align=center|4–0
|Andrew Salas
|Decision (unanimous)
|Bellator 252
|
|align=center|3
|align=center|5:00
|Uncasville, Connecticut, United States
|
|-
|Win
|align=center|3–0
|Will Smith
|TKO (punches)
|Bellator 244 
|
|align=center|2
|align=center|4:14
|Uncasville, Connecticut, United States 
|
|-
|Win
|align=center|2–0
|Jacob Landin
|Submission (forearm choke)
|Bellator 233
|
|align=center|1
|align=center|3:36
|Thackerville, Oklahoma, United States
|
|-
|Win
|align=center|1–0
|Thomas Lopez
|Submission (rear-naked choke)
|Bellator 224
|
|align=center|1
|align=center|3:02
|Thackerville, Oklahoma, United States
|

See also 
 List of current Bellator MMA fighters
 List of male mixed martial artists
 List of undefeated mixed martial artists

References

External links 
  
 

2000 births
Living people
American male mixed martial artists
Bellator male fighters
Mixed martial artists from California
Lightweight mixed martial artists
American practitioners of Brazilian jiu-jitsu
Mixed martial artists utilizing Brazilian jiu-jitsu
People awarded a black belt in Brazilian jiu-jitsu